Horden Brova (born 8 April 1991) is a Ukrainian volleyball player. He was a member of the Ukrainian national volleyball team and Barkom-Kazhany.

Career
Horden Brova started his professional career in Yurydychna Akademiya.

He was a member of the Ukraine men's national volleyball team in 2019 Men's European Volleyball Championship.

Sporting achievements

Clubs 
Ukrainian Championship:
  2017/18, 2018/19
Ukrainian Cup:
  2016/17, 2017/18, 2018/19
Ukrainian Supercup:
  2016/17, 2018/2019, 2019/2020

National Team 
 2017  European League

Individual 
 2016/2017 Best libero  Ukrainian Super League
 2017/2018 Best libero  Ukrainian Super League
 2018/2019 Best libero  Ukrainian Super League
 2016/2017 Best libero  Ukrainian Cup

References

External links

Ukrainian men's volleyball players
VC Barkom-Kazhany players
VC Yurydychna Akademiya Kharkiv players
1991 births
Living people